Lance Lanyon Carr (18 February 1910 – 1983) was a South African former professional football player. He was born in Johannesburg. He played for Liverpool from September 1933 to October 1936 making a total of 31 appearances scoring eight times.

He also played for Aldershot, Newport County, Swindon Town, Bristol City, Bristol Rovers, Gloucester City and Merthyr Tydfil.

Whilst at Liverpool he played baseball in the summer in the nascent NBA leagues, playing for Avalons (1934) in the Liverpool League and then Hurst Hawks (1935) Blackpool Seagulls (1936) and Liverpool Giants (1937) in the North of England League.

References

External links
 Player profile, LFChistory.net

1910 births
1983 deaths
Soccer players from Johannesburg
Liverpool F.C. players
Newport County A.F.C. players
Aldershot F.C. players
Swindon Town F.C. players
Bristol Rovers F.C. players
Gloucester City A.F.C. players
Bristol City F.C. players
Merthyr Tydfil F.C. players
South African soccer players
Association football outside forwards
South African expatriate soccer players
Expatriate footballers in England
Expatriate footballers in Wales
South African expatriate sportspeople in England
South African expatriate sportspeople in Wales